Jason Heinrichs (born December 7, 1970, in Kingston, Ontario, Canada) is a musical producer who works with many bands and artists. He plays piano, guitar, bass and drums in many of his productions.
He released the now rare and classic Anomaly album entitled Howle’s Book on Groove Garden Records with a variety of collaborators  who went on to be respected and prolific artists including Slug from Atmosphere, Eye Dea and DJ Abilities (also from Rhymesayers Records) and various musicians.  It's been widely regarded as an underground classic and still resonates with a great many people.
He attended the prestigious Berklee College of Music in Boston, MA from 1989 to 1994, graduating near the top of his class and earning two bachelor's degrees in Film Scoring & Music Synthesis Production.
While there, he was awarded the Peter Gabriel Production Scholarship by the Berklee faculty.
Jason Heinrichs engineered & remixed a track on  the Lucy Ford album put out by the hip hop group Atmosphere under the name Anomaly. He has produced and remixed many other Minneapolis locals with his studio Satori Sounds. He collaborated with Chicago vocalist Lady Sarah to form the duo called Roomsa. Roomsa has been featured on many compilations including Sneak, Gene Farris, and Miguel Migs. Their songs have been picked up by labels such as Farris Wheel, Salted Music ("Sunrise"), and Aphrodisio. Aphrodisio released their full-length CD called Oceans on March 9, 2007. The songs on the album vary from Down tempo and House music. Jason Heinrichs is also a DJ spinning a variety of electronic music in Minneapolis and other cities.  They were featured in an interview in Britain's DJ Magazine and in 2007 were picked as the Next 100 artists to watch in Los Angeles‘ URB magazine.
In 2000, he played all the instruments, produced, engineered, arranged, recorded and mastered the also classic and out of print sought after album In Definition with the rap duo Cenospecies, releasing it on his own label Peak Records.  It introduced the world to P.O.S. from the successful group Doomtree and won an award from The City Pages in Minneapolis.

Discography

Producer/Musician/Writer/Engineer
 Oceans (Roomsa featuring Lady Sarah, Aphrodisio Records, 2007)
 November Jazz (Roomsa featuring Lady Sarah, featured on DJ Sneak's "House of OM", OM Records, 2005)
 The Sunrise EP (Roomsa featuring Lady Sarah with JT Donaldson, Salted Music, 2004) 
 Sunrise (Roomsa featuring Lady Sarah, featured on Miguel Migs mix CD "24th St. Sounds" on NRK & on the "Beached" compilation on OM Records)
 This Girl (Roomsa featuring Lady Sarah with Kaskade, Aphrodisio Recordings, 2004)
 Tatiana (Roomsa featuring Lady Sarah with Miguel Migs, Aphrodisio Recordings, 2004)
 Stuff Like That (Roomsa featuring Lady Sarah with Johnny Fiasco, Aphrodisio Recordings, 2004)
 Reason Why (Roomsa featuring Lady Sarah, Farris Wheel Records, 2003)
 Dance All Night (Roomsa featuring Lady Sarah with Rasoul, Farris Wheel Records, 2002)
 Tonight (Roomsa featuring Lady Sarah with Glenn Underground, Farris Wheel Records, 2000)
 Contaminated & Square D (from "Varietals Vol. 1", Groove Garden Records, 2000)
 Howle’s Book (CD & 12" EP, Groove Garden Records, 1998)
 Savior (from "Anticon Presents: Music for the Advancement of Hip Hop", Anticon Records, 1998)
 Sidewalk’s End & Done (from "Freeloaded Wednesdays", Garden Groove Records, 1997)

Co-Producer/Musician/Writer/Engineer
 Sanctified Love (Gene Farris featuring Lady Sarah & Roomsa, Defected Records, 2004)
 Black Satin (Gene Farris featuring Lady Sarah & Roomsa, Soma Records, 2003)
 Colab (with Booka B, Groove Garden Records, 2002)
 Linear Language (Syst, Poor Bastard Records, 2002)
 In Definition (with Cenospecies, Peak Records, 2001)
 City Lights (Dylan Hicks, No Alternative Records, 2001)
 Claude Debussy (Dylan Hooks, No Alternative Records, 1998)

As Remixer/Engineer
 Groove With Me (Jevne featuring FourFeet (Jason Heinrichs Remix), Vino Recordings, 2005)
 Lucy Ford – Ford One (Atmosphere, Rhymesayers Entertainment, 2001)
 Rebellion EP (Raw Villa, Black Corners, 2000)
 Conflict & Compromise(Oddjobs, Interlock Records, 1999)

References

Canadian record producers
American record producers
Canadian expatriate musicians in the United States
Musicians from Kingston, Ontario
Canadian people of German descent
Living people
1970 births